The 2013 AFC Futsal Club Championship qualification were held to determine 5 spots to the final tournament. The teams finishing first, second and third in the 2012 AFC Futsal Club Championship, receive automatic byes to the final round. It will between 11 and 24 April 2013.

Format 
Sixteen teams registered in qualifying action for 5 places in the finals. Reigning champions Iran, runners-up Uzbekistan, Japan have direct entry into the tournament proper. The remaining Thirteen team will play in the qualification rounds. The result of the draw for the groups was announced on 13 February 2013. Zone 1 teams will play a round-robin groupstage, with the top two teams qualifying to the semi-finals. The winner of both semi-finals will the progress to the final tournament as well. Zone 2 will play a round-robin groupstage, with the top two teams qualifying to the semi-finals. A total of three teams from Zone 2 qualifiers will qualify for the finals.

Zones

West, South and Central Asian (Zone 1) 
The matches will be played in Panasonic Sports Complex, Shah Alam, Malaysia from April 19 to 24, 2013.

Group A

Group B

Semi-finals

Final 

port

ASEAN/East (Zone 2) 
The matches will be played in Panasonic Sports Complex, Shah Alam, Malaysia from April 11 to 16, 2013.

Group A

Group B

Semi-finals

3rd/4th Placing

Final

Goal scorers

Zone 1 
6 goals

  Amro Mohaseen (Al Sadd)

5 goals

  Hassan Chaito (Al Sadaka)
  Mohamed Ibrahim Rashid (Al Sadd)

4 goals

  Hamzah Muhammad (Al Salmiya)

3 goals

  Jamil Abdulkarim (Al Wasl)

2 goals

  Mustafa Bachay Hamzah (Naft Al Wasat)
  Karrar Mohsin Mohammed (Naft Al Wasat)
  Predrag Rajić (Al Sadaka)
  Patrick Vieira Luz (Al Sadd)
  Yasser Salman (Al Sadaka)
  Moustafa Serhan (Al Sadaka)
  Mohamed Ismail Ahmed Ismail (Al Sadd)
  Flavio Barreto Arantes (Al Sadd)
  Sidnei Mauricio (Al Salmiya)
  Naser Alqalaf (Al Salmiya)
  Salem Almekaimi (Al Salmiya)
  Angellott Alexander (Al Wasl)

1 goal

  Ahmad Mollaali (Al Sadd)
  Ahmed Mahmood (Al Wasl)
  Rafael Henmi (Al Wasl)
  Rabie El Kakhi (Al Sadaka)
  Jean Kouteny (Al Sadaka)
  Khalil Ahmad (Al Sadd)
  Kosta Markovic (Al Sadaka)
  Abdulrahman Alwadi (Al Salmiya)
  Hossein Niazi (Naft Al Wasat)
  Farhad Tavakoli (Naft Al Wasat)
  Kassem Kawsan (Al Sadaka)
  Marwan Georges (Al Sadaka)
  Salem Hazem (Al Wasl)
  Sherzod Jumaev (Dordoi)
  Erkin Kesha (Dordoi)
  Firas Mohammed Abed (Naft Al Wasat)
  Chingiz China (Dordoi)
  Karim Zeid (Al Sadaka)
  Omar Abdulraouf (Al Wasl)
  Bader Ibrahim (Al Wasl)

Own goals

  Marwan Georges (Al Sadaka)

Zone 2 
8 goals

  Kritsada Wongkaeo (Chonburi Blue Wave)
  Suphawut Thueanklang (Chonburi Blue Wave)

6 goals

  Vahid Shamsaei (Shenzhen Nanling)
  Danilo (Shenzhen Nanling)

5 goals

  Apiwat Chaemcharoen (Chonburi Blue Wave)

4 goals

  Tanakorn Santanaprasit (Chonburi Blue Wave)
  Kiatiyot Chalarmkhet (Chonburi Blue Wave)
  Phung Trong Luan (Thái Sơn Nam)
  Lu Yue (Shenzhen Nanling)

3 goals

  Chang Han (Tainan City)
  Liu Chi-Chao (Tainan City)
  Zeng Liang (Shenzhen Nanling)
  Jarrod Basger (Dural Warriors)
  Kotaro Inaba (Thái Sơn Nam)

2 goals

  Pham Thanh Dat (Thái Sơn Nam)
  Nguyen Bao Quan (Thái Sơn Nam)
  Luu Quynh Toan (Thái Sơn Nam)
  Davod Abassi (Pasargad)
  Gregory Giovenali (Dural Warriors)
  Lertchai Issarasuwipakorn (Chonburi Blue Wave)
  Ulit Lassanakarn (Chonburi Blue Wave)
  Wu, Chun-Ching (Tainan City)
  Huang Cheng-Tsung (Tainan City)
  Alberto Riquer Anton (Thái Sơn Nam)
  Kuang Xuanpu (Shenzhen Nanling)
  Xapa (Chonburi Blue Wave)
  Ahmad Zulfikar (Pelindo)

1 goal

  Blake Rosier (Dural Warriors)
  Zach Caruana (Dural Warriors)
  Adam Bradley (Dural Warriors)
  Nathan Niski (Dural Warriors)
  Tobias Seeto (Dural Warriors)
  Hairul Saleh Ohorella (Pelindo)
  Hairul Saleh Ohorella (Pelindo)
  Nattawut Madyalan (Chonburi Blue Wave)
  Le Quoc Nam (Thái Sơn Nam)
  Soroush Zalmoo (Pasargad)
  Huang Jiafu (Shenzhen Nanling)

Own goals
 Zeng Liang (Shenzhen Nanling), Scored for Pasargad (1)

Qualifiers 

The following eight teams will play the final tournament.

2012 tournament
 Giti Pasand Isfahan (Iranian Futsal Super League (1st))
 (Uzbekistan Futsal League (2nd))
 Nagoya Oceans (F. League (3rd)) and Host nation

East and Southeast
  Chonburi Blue Wave (1st)
  Shenzhen Nanling (2nd)
  Thai Son Nam (3rd)
South and Central Asian
  Al Sadd (1st)
  Al Sadaka (2nd)

See also
 2013 AFC Futsal Club Championship

References

External links
 

qualification
qualification
International futsal competitions hosted by Malaysia
2013 in Malaysian football